Walden's Path School is located  in Hyderabad, India. It follows Cambridge IGCSE syllabi. The School is inspired by Jiddu Krishnamurti's Educational Philosophy.

Philosophy
The school is inspired by Jiddu Krishnamurti's philosophy and his life work. Walden's Path is based on the notion that children need to be able to get to information following their own path, construct and create their own knowledge and paths.

Learning Approach
Walden's Path School follows The Studio Approach with Science, Mathematics, Language and Literature. The School admits students in grades 1 and below. Walden's Path School developed an approach and methodology that enables children to discover multiple ways of solving problems in Mathematics and applying concepts in Science.

Studio Based Learning

Walden's Path School follows Studio-Based Learning and is inspired by John Dewey's work and education philosophy. Unlike a lab that uses standardized procedures with set equipment to reproduce a protocol in order to obtain set outcomes, a Studio is a space that invigorates, inspires and provides an opportunity to create, construct and test objectives and hypotheses and analyse data.

See also
Rishi Valley School
The School KFI
The Valley School
Vidyaranya High School
Oak Grove School (Ojai, California)
Alternative School
Alternative education
Jiddu Krishnamurti
Reggio Emilia approach
Montessori method
Waldorf education

References

External links
 Walden's Path Official website
The Walden School

Progressive education
 
Experiential learning
Alternative education
Early childhood education
Schools in Hyderabad, India
Jiddu Krishnamurti schools
2014 establishments in Telangana
Educational institutions established in 2014